Roberto Venturini (born 30 December 1960) is a Sammarinese politician who served as a Captain Regent with Andrea Belluzzi, from April to October 2015. He was first elected to the Grand and General Council in 2012 as a Christian Democrat. He lives in Serravalle and has two children.

References

1960 births
People from the City of San Marino
Captains Regent of San Marino
Members of the Grand and General Council
Living people
Sammarinese Christian Democratic Party politicians